Foxcon Aviation & Research Pty Ltd, (usually just Foxcon Aviation) is an Australian aircraft manufacturer based in Mackay, Queensland that was founded in 1995. The company specializes in the design and manufacture of light aircraft in the form of kits for amateur construction and ready-to-fly aircraft.

The company was formed "to manufacture extremely competitive high performance light aircraft at an affordable price." Working in composite materials, the company has expanded its space over the years and added a climate-controlled vacuum bag molding capability, plus sandwich construction molding jigs.

Although the Foxcon Terrier 100 was at one time produced, the company's sole current product is the Foxcon Terrier 200, powered by a Subaru EA81 automotive conversion engine or Rotax 912ULS aircraft engine, although a four-seat Foxcon Terrier 400 is under development.

Aircraft

References

External links

Aircraft manufacturers of Australia
Ultralight aircraft
Homebuilt aircraft
Companies based in Queensland
Australian companies established in 1995
Mackay, Queensland